Sam Schröder defeated Niels Vink in the final, 7–6(7–5), 6–1 to win the quad singles wheelchair tennis title at the 2022 Wimbledon Championships.

Dylan Alcott was the two-time reigning champion, but retired from professional tennis in January 2022.

Seeds

Draw

Finals

References

Sources
 Entry List
 Draw
 ITF Tournament Details

Quad Wheelchair Singles